The Alcohol and Tobacco Tax Bureau is a Maryland state government agency responsible for 
monitoring the manufacture, storage, transportation, sale and distribution of alcoholic beverages and tobacco. 
collecting state taxes on beer, wine, distilled spirits, cigarettes and other tobacco products. 
issuing licenses and permits.
 
The Bureau maintains automated credit control information for the alcohol industry. MATT also provides online verification of licenses and permits and electronic funds transfer payment services.

External links
 Alcohol and Tobacco Tax Bureau

State alcohol agencies of the United States
Alcohol and Tobacco